Charlotte Preparatory School may refer to:

Charlotte Preparatory School in Charlotte, North Carolina.
Charlotte Preparatory School in Port Charlotte, Florida